Korean Olympics may refer to:

 1988 Summer Olympics, held in Seoul, South Korea
 2018 Winter Olympics, held in Pyeongchang, South Korea
 Korea at the Olympics (IOC code: COR), the unified joint united Koreas at the Olympics
 South Korea at the Olympics (IOC code: KOR) the Republic of Korea
 North Korea at the Olympics (IOC code: PRK) the Democratic People's Republic of Korea

See also
 Korean Paralympics (disambiguation)